Schlechteranthus is a genus of flowering plants belonging to the family Aizoaceae.

It is native to the Cape Provinces within the South African Republic.

The genus name of Schlechteranthus is in honour of Max Schlechter (1874–1960), brother and colleague of Rudolf Schlechter (a German taxonomist, botanist, and author of several works on orchids). While, Max was a German collector of natural history specimens. 
It was first described and published in Monatsschr. Deutsch. Kakteen-Ges. Vol.1 on page 16 in 1929.

Species
According to Kew:

Schlechteranthus abruptus 
Schlechteranthus albiflorus 
Schlechteranthus connatus 
Schlechteranthus diutinus 
Schlechteranthus hallii 
Schlechteranthus holgatensis 
Schlechteranthus inclusus 
Schlechteranthus maximiliani 
Schlechteranthus parvus 
Schlechteranthus pungens 
Schlechteranthus spinescens 
Schlechteranthus steenbokensis 
Schlechteranthus stylosus 
Schlechteranthus subglobosus 
Schlechteranthus tetrasepalus

References

Aizoaceae
Aizoaceae genera
Plants described in 1929
Flora of the Cape Provinces